Referees who participated in a World Championship (Men and/or Women) or in Olympic Handball Tournaments shall receive the Referee's Diploma of Honour upon termination of their international career.

The diploma is presented by the PRC president or his representative.

External links
 IHF Statuts Chapter XXI - Regulations of Awards

International Handball Federation awards